Ricardo Roberto Bocanegra Vega (born May 3, 1989, in Las Vegas, Nevada) is a former professional footballer who last played as a midfielder for Charlotte Independence in the USL Championship. Born in the United States, he has previously represented the Mexico under-23 national team.

Personal life 
Bocanegra was born in Las Vegas, Nevada, but grew up in La Paz, Baja California Sur.

Club career 
Bocanegra came from the youth team of Atlas. On 2011 he won the gold medal at the Pan American Games with Mexico.

Honors
Mexico U23
Pan American Games: 2011

References

External links
 
 

1989 births
Living people
Ascenso MX players
Association football midfielders
Charlotte Independence players
Atlas F.C. footballers
Correcaminos UAT footballers
Expatriate footballers in Nicaragua
Footballers from Baja California Sur
Mexican footballers
Footballers at the 2011 Pan American Games
Irapuato F.C. footballers
Liga MX players
Liga Premier de México players
Mexican expatriate footballers
Mexican expatriate sportspeople in Nicaragua
Murciélagos FC footballers
New York Cosmos B players
Nicaraguan Primera División players
Pan American Games gold medalists for Mexico
Pan American Games medalists in football
People from La Paz, Baja California Sur
Real Estelí F.C. players
Soccer players from Las Vegas
Sportspeople from Las Vegas
USL Championship players
Medalists at the 2011 Pan American Games